State Route 235 (SR-235), also known as Washington Boulevard, is a state highway in the U.S. state of Utah. Spanning , it serves as a north/south minor arterial road through Weber County, connecting US-89 in Ogden to SR-134 in North Ogden.

Route description
State Route 235 begins at the intersection of Washington Boulevard (US-89) and 2nd Street in Ogden. At this point, US-89 turns from its north-south routing along Washington Boulevard to the northwest along Harrisville Road while Washington continues north and becomes SR-235. Shortly after this transition, the route passes a one-way pair on the east (SR-286) servicing the Ogden–Weber Technical College. The route continues north, exiting Ogden and entering the city of North Ogden passing a number of shopping centers and suburban neighborhoods. At 2550 North, the route passes the former westbound routing of SR-235 before ending shortly after at 2600 North (SR-134).

History
Washington Boulevard from Ogden through North Ogden was originally designated as part of SR-1 in 1910. This route originally continued north along Washington Boulevard before turning northwest through Pleasant View along what is now Pleasant View Drive, meeting with SR-204 near the Utah Hot Springs at the Weber County-Box Elder County border. This route became US-91 and US-30S in 1926, and the US-89 designation was added in the late 1930s. In 1945, Route 1 (as well as the US route designations) were realigned to follow the diagonal stretch of SR-204 along what is now US-89, truncating SR-204 in the process, and at the same time, SR-235 was created along the former routing of SR-1 through Pleasant View.

In 1969, at the same time as a mass-deletion of minor highways, State Route 235's northwestern stretch along Pleasant View Drive was removed from the highway system, and the route was realigned so that it now turned west in North Ogden, very near its current northern terminus. This new routing took it west along 2550 North for  until ending at US-89. As a result, travellers in this area wanting to access Interstate 15 or points west would need to travel along SR-235, turn onto US-89 for a short distance, then continue west along SR-134.

A new, wider two-lane road that extended SR-134 to the east to Washington Boulevard was built in 2004.

Major intersections

References

External links

235
 235
Ogden, Utah
Streets in Utah